Cacophrissus is a genus of beetles in the family Cerambycidae, containing the following species:

 Cacophrissus maculipennis Chemsak & Linsley, 1963
 Cacophrissus pauper Bates, 1885
 Cacophrissus pubescens Chemsak & Linsley, 1963

References

Hesperophanini